Burukutu is an alcoholic beverage, brewed from the grains of Guinea corn (Sorghum bicolor) and millet (Pennisetum glaucum). 
The alcoholic beverage is often produced in Tropical African countries such as Nigeria, Togo, Kenya, Ethiopia and Burundi as one of the major traditional and local alcoholic drinks. It is commonly consumed in Northern Guinea savanna region of Nigeria, Ghana, Togo, and Republic of Benin.

Production
Burukutu production has many processes depending on the African country in particular or the ethnic regions, but five basic stages have been known to be consistent all through. (Daniel, 2022). The five basic stages include: steeping, malting, mashing, fermentation, and maturation. 
The production begins by malting, which involves the conversion of the Guinea corn or millet grains into malt and this takes place on a malting floor. This process is followed by steeping, which involves the soaking of the grains in water for at least three days to allow the grain to absorb moisture and to begin to sprout.
When the grain has absorbed enough moisture, it is transferred to the malting floor, where it is constantly turned over for around five days while it is air-dried. This procedure is followed by mashing in which the milled grain known as the "grain bill" (malted grain) is mixed with water known as "liquor" and heating the mixture. This process allows the enzymes in the grain bill to decompose the starch in the grain into sugars (maltose) to form a wort. 
The product is allowed to ferment using the sugar fungi form of yeast and allow maturation for 2 days or 48 hours.

In Nigeria particularly in Kebbi state, Guinea corn is used in place of millet or sorghum in other places due to its sweeter taste and thicker consistency. Malting proceeds and the corn is grounded. The grounded corn is mixed with water and the solution homogenised. The solution is left to ferment for a day or two depending on how well organoleptic properties and fermentation process are considered. The fermented corn is cooked and drained into another bowl when cooled. Adjuncts like Garri can be added but part of another batch of the grounded corn called a greul is added to introduce wild strains from malted corn and give a consistent flavour. The gruel and cooked fermented corn are mixed together and boiled once more. Burukutu is cooled, the next day and served to customers. Overall, the process of Burukutu production takes a period of 7 days so local producers have a batch fermentation system to keep up with their growing consumers in the North (Daniel, 2022).

Gallery

See also

 Umqombothi, Chibuku and Munkoyo or 'Ibwatu' in Zambia.

References

African drinks
Nigerian drinks
Nigerian distilled drinks